The Light Brigade may refer to:

 The Light Brigade (DC Comics), a DC Comics series written by Peter Tomasi
 "The Light Brigade" (Trident Comics), a story by Neil Gaiman and Nigel Kitching, published in the 1989–1990 anthology Trident
 "The Light Brigade" (The Outer Limits), a 1996 TV episode
 The Light Brigade (album), a 2014 album by Daedelus
 The Light Brigade, easy listening band conducted by Enoch Light in the 1940s-1960s
The Light Brigade, a novel by Kameron Hurley.

See also
 Charge of the Light Brigade (disambiguation)
 Light Cavalry (disambiguation)